, located in Iwaizumi, Iwate Prefecture in the Tōhoku region of northern Japan, is the longest limestone cavern in Japan, with a measured length of . The cave system was designated as a Natural monument by the Japanese government in 1980. Since 1991, a portion of the caverns have been open to the public for part of the year.

Outline
There are flowstones and a subterranean lake.

Access 
Iwaizumi Town Bus
From/to Iwaizumibashi

References

External links

A Trip to Iwate
Japan Travel Guide
Morioka-Hachimantai Tourist Advisor

Caves of Japan
Landforms of Iwate Prefecture
Tourist attractions in Iwate Prefecture
Show caves in Japan
Iwaizumi, Iwate